Leandro P. "Lee" Rizzuto (April 10, 1938 – December 3, 2017) was an American billionaire businessman, and the chairman and co-founder of Conair Corporation, which was almost fully owned by him.

Early life
He was born in Brooklyn, the son of Julian and Josephine Rizzuto. His father was born Nicola in Italy, but later changed his name to Julian, and Josephine's New York Times 1983 obituary refers to him as Nicola.

Leandro had two sisters, Anita Casamento of Brooklyn and Pauline Navarra of Phoenix.

In 1959, Rizzuto dropped out of St. John's University to assist his family in setting up a hair products business in the basement of their Brooklyn home; this would later become Conair.

Career
In December 2017, his net worth was estimated at $3.5 billion.

Personal life
He was divorced, with four children, and lived in Sheridan, Wyoming.

On December 3, 2017, Rizzuto died from pancreatic cancer.

On January 5, 2018, President Donald Trump appointed his son Leandro Rizzuto Jr., to the position of Ambassador Extraordinary and Plenipotentiary of the United States to Barbados, as well as St. Kitts and Nevis and Saint Lucia.

References

1938 births
2017 deaths
American billionaires
American people of Italian descent
Deaths from pancreatic cancer
Deaths from cancer in Wyoming
American company founders
People from Brooklyn
People from Sheridan, Wyoming